"Knocking at Your Back Door" is a song by the British hard rock band Deep Purple, the first track of the album Perfect Strangers, which was released in October 1984. The song was written by Ritchie Blackmore, Ian Gillan and Roger Glover. The track received heavy airplay at the time, playing on heavy rotation. It was used by the Seattle SuperSonics in their lineup intro during home games.

Background
The song is lyrically about anal sex, as it uses various sexual innuendos throughout the song. Ian Gillan commented:

After receiving considerable airplay, the song was released commercially in the US in December 1984, while in the UK, it was released as the second single from the Perfect Strangers album in June 1985.

"Knocking at Your Back Door" was a permanent part of the band's live set until 1994 and sporadically since then. Live albums that include the track are: Nobody's Perfect (1988), In the Absence of Pink (1991), Come Hell or High Water (DVD, 1994), Live in Europe 1993 (2007), and Live at Montreux 2011 (2011)

Charts

References

1984 songs
Deep Purple songs
Songs written by Ritchie Blackmore
Songs written by Ian Gillan
Songs written by Roger Glover